Charles Fowler (1792–1867) was an English architect.

Charles Fowler may also refer to:
 
 Charles A. Fowler, New York state senator, see 103rd and 104th New York State Legislatures
 Charles A. Fowler (engineer), recipient of the Eugene G. Fubini Award, see Defense Science Board
 Charles Henry Fowler (1837–1908), Canadian-American Bishop of the Methodist Episcopal Church
 C. Hodgson Fowler (1840–1910), English architect
 Charles J. Fowler, former president of the American Holiness Association, see Eastern Nazarene College
 Charles N. Fowler (1852–1932), American national politician
 Charlie Fowler (1954–2006), American mountain climber, writer, and photographer
 Charlie Fowler (footballer) (1902–1970), Australian rules footballer 
 Charles Astley Fowler (1865–1940), officer in the British Indian Army